Olga Guirao (born 1956) is a Spanish novelist. She was born in Barcelona. Her first novel Mi querido Sebastian was nominated for the 1992 Premio Herralde. Since then, she has published several more books, including Adversarios admirables, Carta con diez años de retraso and La llamada.

References

1956 births
Living people
People from Barcelona
20th-century Spanish novelists
21st-century Spanish novelists
21st-century Spanish women writers
20th-century Spanish women writers